Jean Valat (born 26 October 1951) is a French equestrian. He competed in two events at the 1976 Summer Olympics.

References

1951 births
Living people
French male equestrians
Olympic equestrians of France
Equestrians at the 1976 Summer Olympics
Place of birth missing (living people)